Brendan Kevin Donnelly (born July 4, 1971) is a former Major League Baseball relief pitcher. A right-hander, Donnelly pitched for twenty-one teams (two of them independents), twelve organizations, two independent leagues, eleven organized minor leagues, and both the American League and the National League.

He won the World Series in 2002 with the Anaheim Angels and was on the roster for the Boston Red Sox during their 2007 World Series victory. Donnelly was also the winning pitcher of the 2003 All-Star Game.

After ten seasons in minor league baseball and eight seasons in Major League Baseball, he retired in 2011.

Career

Minor leagues
Donnelly was drafted by the Chicago White Sox in the 27th round of the 1992 Major League Baseball Draft. The White Sox released him in April 1993. In June 1993, he signed with the Chicago Cubs organization; the Cubs released him before the start of the 1994 season. In 1994, he played for the independent Ohio Valley Redcoats.

In March 1995, he signed with the Cincinnati Reds and participated in Spring Training as a replacement player during the 1994 Major League Baseball strike. As a result of his participation as a replacement player, Donnelly is permanently barred from joining the Major League Baseball Players Association. Donnelly remained in the Reds organization until he was released in April 1999.

He started the 1999 season with the independent Nashua Pride. In May 1999, he was purchased by the Tampa Bay Devil Rays. He was released on August 12, 1999. On August 18, 1999, he was signed by the Pittsburgh Pirates. He was released on August 25, 1999. On August 26, 1999, he was signed by the Toronto Blue Jays. He was released in July 2000. In August 2000, he signed with the Chicago Cubs. He became a free agent after the 2000 season.

Anaheim Angels
In January 2001, he signed with the Anaheim Angels, where he made his major league debut in 2002 at 30 years of age. He was an immediate fan favorite because of his intensity, the goggles that he wears, and his effectiveness as the main setup man to Troy Percival. Donnelly would go on to play an integral part of the Angels' bullpen in their 2002 championship season, serving as the winning pitcher in Game 6 of the World Series. 

Donnelly was the third replacement player to win the World Series, behind both Shane Spencer of the 1998, 1999 and 2000 New York Yankees and Damian Miller of the 2001 Arizona Diamondbacks. His name does not appear on any official commemorative merchandise from the Angels 2002 World Series win, due to him being barred from the MLBPA.

In 2003, in that same role, Donnelly put up a 1.58 earned run average and became a rare example of a non-closer who was selected as an All-Star. Donnelly went on to be the winning pitcher in that mid-summer classic.

He suffered a broken nose during spring training 2004, causing him to miss a large portion of the season. Donnelly remained fairly effective throughout 2004 in a very good bullpen for the American League West Champion Anaheim Angels. In 2005, Donnelly began to see a decline in performance, including a decrease in velocity on his fastball as a set-up man for closer Francisco Rodríguez after Percival's departure. In June 2005, Donnelly was suspended ten days for having pine tar on his glove., an incident that caused a scrum and accusations that former teammate Jose Guillen tipped manager Frank Robinson The suspension was the culmination of three weeks of extra scrutiny on Donnelly from opposing managers and umpires, including an accusation from then-Chicago White Sox manager Ozzie Guillén accusing Donnelly of touching his mouth too often. He would later advocate for the legalization of pine tars for pitchers.

In 2006, Donnelly continued to drop down the depth chart in the bullpen becoming an inconsistent middle reliever.

Boston Red Sox
On December 15, 2006, Donnelly was traded to the Boston Red Sox for Phil Seibel.

On July 31, 2007, it was announced that Donnelly would need Tommy John surgery. During his absence, the Red Sox would eventually go on to win the 2007 World Series. Donnelly became a free agent after the 2007 season.

Cleveland Indians
On February 6, 2008, the Cleveland Indians signed Donnelly to a minor league contract with an invitation to spring training. The Indians hoped Donnelly would provide bullpen help at the end of the season when he recovered from Tommy John surgery.

Donnelly was brought up to the Indians in August 2008, as a replacement for Tom Mastny.

2009
In February 2009, he was signed by the Texas Rangers. He was released in March 2009. In April 2009, he signed with the Houston Astros. He was released on July 1, 2009. On July 5, 2009, Donnelly signed with the Florida Marlins. He became a free agent after the 2009 season.

Pittsburgh Pirates
On January 16, 2010, Donnelly agreed with the Pittsburgh Pirates on a one-year deal worth $1.5 million. Before he could reach incentives that would have approximately doubled his salary, the Pirates released Donnelly in July 2010 denying that the incentives were the reason for the release. He was the last of the replacement players still in the major leagues, signifying no conciliatory admittance into the MLBPA more than 15 years after  His likeness, name, and uniform number were still replaced by fictional players in video games.

Retirement
He announced his retirement on March 9, 2011.

Mitchell Report
Donnelly was named in the December 13, 2007 Mitchell Report regarding the use of performance-enhancing drugs in baseball. According to former clubhouse attendant and admitted steroids distributor Kirk Radomski, Donnelly sought him out in 2004 looking to purchase oxandrolone, an anabolic steroid. Radomski says he made one sale of nandrolone to Donnelly, for which he received $250–$300. In a statement in response to the report, Donnelly admitted contacting Radomski in 2004 regarding oxandrolone, hoping it would help him recover from injuries faster. Donnelly denied ever buying or using the drug because he was made aware that it was considered a steroid.

See also
List of Major League Baseball replacement players
List of Major League Baseball players named in the Mitchell Report

References

External links

1971 births
Living people
Major League Baseball pitchers
American League All-Stars
Baseball players from Washington, D.C.
Major League Baseball replacement players
Anaheim Angels players
Los Angeles Angels players
Boston Red Sox players
Cleveland Indians players
Colorado Mesa Mavericks baseball players
Florida Marlins players
Pittsburgh Pirates players
Gulf Coast White Sox players
Geneva Cubs players
Ohio Valley Redcoats players
Winston-Salem Warthogs players
Indianapolis Indians players
Charleston AlleyCats players
Chattanooga Lookouts players
Nashua Pride players
Durham Bulls players
Syracuse SkyChiefs players
Altoona Curve players
Iowa Cubs players
Arkansas Travelers players
Salt Lake Stingers players
Rancho Cucamonga Quakes players
Buffalo Bisons (minor league) players
Kinston Indians players
Gulf Coast Indians players
Round Rock Express players
Jupiter Hammerheads players